Juncus fascinatus is a species of flowering plant in the family Juncaceae, native to Texas. Its specific epithet refers to Enchanted Rock, where it was first collected.

References

fascinatus
Endemic flora of the United States
Endemic flora of Texas
Plants described in 2014
Flora without expected TNC conservation status